Zalissia National Nature Park is state reserve that covers a large forest on the left bank of the Desna River about 20 km northeast of Kyiv.  As of 2017, the area is open for limited public access, but is primarily administered as a protected area for the "reception and stay of senior officials", other state uses, and the protection of plant and animal life.  A transition to traditional national park status, decreed in 2009, had not been implemented as of 2017.  The park is administratively in Brovary Raion of Kyiv Oblast

Topography
The meandering Desna River runs from north to south along the west border of the park.  The channel itself is 5–10 km from the park, while the park is on the first and second terraces.  The park is about 10 km wide (west-to-east) and 20 km north-to-south.

Climate and ecoregion
The climate of Zalissia is Humid continental climate, warm summer (Köppen climate classification (Dfb)).

The park is located in the Central European mixed forests ecoregion, a temperate hardwood forest covering much of northeastern Europe, from Germany to Russia.

Flora and fauna
Pine trees are most common, at 85% of the forested area.  Oak trees cover 7%, alder 5%, and other species 3%.  An estimated 1,700 hectares of pine forest is over 100 years old.

Public use
As of 2017, the park was still primarily administered for state purposes, and no timetable had been set for transition to a traditional national park.  The territory is administered by Ukraine's State Administration of Affairs for the "provision of proper conditions for the reception and stay of senior officials of the state, heads of foreign states and official delegations of foreign states, international organizations", and also for the protection of plant and animal life.  The 'Residence Zalissia' on the site is open to the public, and ecological excursions, horseback riding, bird-watching visits and similar recreation can be pre-arranged with forestry department officials.

See also
 National Parks of Ukraine

References

External links
 Borders of NNP Zalissia, on OpenStreetMap.org

National parks of Ukraine